Sülzburgstraße is a station on the Cologne Stadtbahn line 18, located in the Cologne district of Lindenthal. The station lies on Luxemburger Straße at its junction with the shopping street Sülzburgstraße, after which the station is named.

The station was opened in 1898 and consists of one island platform with two rail tracks.

See also 
 List of Cologne KVB stations

External links 
 station info page 

Cologne KVB stations
Lindenthal, Cologne
Railway stations in Germany opened in 1898